Victor/Victoria is a 1982 musical comedy film written and directed by Blake Edwards and starring Julie Andrews, James Garner, Robert Preston, Lesley Ann Warren, Alex Karras, and John Rhys-Davies. The film was produced by Tony Adams and scored by Henry Mancini, with lyrics by Leslie Bricusse. Released by Metro-Goldwyn-Mayer, it was adapted in 1995 as a Broadway musical. The film was nominated for seven Academy Awards and won the Academy Award for Best Original Score. It is a remake of the 1933 German film Victor and Victoria.

Plot
In 1934 Paris, Carroll "Toddy" Todd, an aging gay performer at Club Chez Lui in Paris, sees Labisse, the owner, auditioning frail and impoverished soprano, Victoria Grant. After her failed audition, Victoria returns to her hotel room to find herself about to be evicted, as she is unable to pay her rent. That night, when Richard, a hustler with whom Toddy is romantically involved, comes to Chez Lui as part of a straight foursome, Toddy incites a brawl resulting in major damages and the police locking up whomever they can get their hands on. Labisse fires Toddy and bans him from the club. Walking home, he spots Victoria in a restaurant. She invites him to join her. As neither of them can pay for the meal, she has a plan to dump a cockroach in her salad to avoid paying, but it escapes and mayhem ensues.

The duo runs through the rain to Toddy's, and he invites her to stay when she discovers the rain has shrunken and damaged her decrepit clothing. The next morning, Richard shows up to collect his things. Victoria, who is wearing his suit and hat, hides in Toddy's closet. When Richard opens the closet door, she punches him, breaking his nose before finally kicking him out. Seeing this, Toddy is struck with the inspiration of passing Victoria off as a man and presenting her to Andre Cassell, the most successful talent agent in Paris, as a female impersonator.

Cassell accepts her as Count Victor Grazinski, a gay Polish female impersonator and Toddy's new boyfriend. Cassell gets her a booking in a nightclub show and invites a collection of club owners to the opening. Among the guests is King Marchand, a Chicago gangster, and his ditzy blonde moll Norma Cassidy and burly bodyguard Mr. Bernstein, also known as Squash. Victoria is an immediate hit, and King is smitten, but he is shocked when she "reveals" herself to be a man at the end of the act. King, however, is convinced that "Victor" is not a man.

After Norma violently attacks King during a quarrel, he sends her back to the United States. Determined to uncover the truth, King sneaks into Victoria and Toddy's suite and confirms his suspicion when he spies her getting into the bath. Back in Chicago, Norma, still angry over being dumped, tells King's business partner Sal Andretti that King is having an affair with a man. King invites Victoria, Toddy, and Cassell to Chez Lui. Another major fight breaks out. Squash and Toddy are both arrested, along with many of the club clientele, but King and Victoria manage to escape. King kisses Victoria, pretending that he does not care about Victoria's assumed gender.

Squash returns to the suite and catches King in bed with Victoria. King tries to explain, but then Squash reveals he himself is gay. Victoria and King argue over whether or not the relationship could work and Victoria discovers that King is not really a gangster but someone who pretends to be in order to stay in the nightclub business, leading Victoria to point out that they are both pretending to be something they are not. Victoria returns to her room and finds Squash in bed with Toddy.

Meanwhile, Labisse hires a private investigator, Charles Bovin, to tail and investigate Victor. Victoria and King attempt to live together for a while, but keeping up her deception strains the relationship to the breaking point, and King ends it. 

At the same time that Victoria has decided to give up the persona of Victor in order to be with King, Sal arrives and demands that King transfer his share of the business to Sal for a fraction of what it is actually worth. Squash tells Victoria what is happening, and she shows Norma that she is really a woman, saving King's stake. That night at the club, Cassell tells Toddy and Victoria that Labisse has lodged a police complaint against him and "Victor" for perpetrating a public fraud. After checking for himself, the inspector tells Labisse that the performer he saw in the room, after opening the door, is a man and that Labisse is an idiot.

In the end, Victoria joins King in the club as her real self. The announcer says that Victor is going to perform, but instead of Victoria, Toddy masquerades as "Victor". After an intentionally disastrous but ultimately hilarious performance, Toddy claims that this is his last performance.

Cast

Musical numbers
The vocal numbers in the film are presented as nightclub acts, with choreography by Paddy Stone. However, the lyrics or situations of some of the songs are calculated to relate to the unfolding drama. Thus, the two staged numbers "Le Jazz Hot" and "The Shady Dame from Seville" help to present Victoria as a female impersonator. The latter number is later reinterpreted by Toddy for diversionary purposes in the plot, and the cozy relationship of Toddy and Victoria is promoted by the song "You and Me", which is sung before the audience at the nightclub.

 "Gay Paree" – Toddy
 "Le Jazz Hot!" – Victoria
 "The Shady Dame from Seville" – Victoria
 "You and Me" – Toddy, Victoria
 "Chicago, Illinois" – Norma
 "Crazy World" – Victoria
 "Finale/Shady Dame from Seville (Reprise)" – Toddy

Occasionally, Victoria and Toddy sing "Home on the Range" when they are in the hotel.

Production
The film's screenplay was adapted by Blake Edwards (Andrews' husband) from the 1933 German film Victor and Victoria written and directed by Reinhold Schünzel from an original story treatment by Hans Hoemburg. According to Edwards, the screenplay took only one month to write. Andrews watched the 1933 version to prepare for her role. The film had been planned as early as 1978 with Andrews to star alongside Peter Sellers, but Sellers died in 1980 while Andrews and Edwards were filming S.O.B. (1981), so Robert Preston was cast in the role of Toddy.

The costume worn by Andrews in the number "The Shady Dame from Seville" is in fact the same costume worn by Preston at the end of the film. It was made to fit Preston, and then, using a series of hooks and eyes at the back, it was drawn in tight to fit Andrews' shapely figure. Black silk ruffles were added to the bottom of the garment to hide the differences in height. The fabric is a black and brown crepe, with fine gold threads woven into it, that when lit appears to have an almost wet look about it.

Release
Victor/Victoria was the opening night film at Filmex on March 16, 1982. It opened in New York, Los Angeles, and Toronto on March 19, 1982.

Reception

Critical response
The site's critical consensus reads, "Driven by a fantastic lead turn from Julie Andrews, Blake Edwards' musical gender-bender is sharp, funny and all-round entertaining." On Metacritic, it has a score of 84 out of 100 based on reviews from 12 critics, indicating "universal acclaim".

Roger Ebert of the Chicago Sun-Times gave it 3 out of 4 stars and wrote: "Not only a funny movie, but, unexpectedly, a warm and friendly one."
Todd McCarthy of Variety called it "sparkling, ultra-sophisticated entertainment from Blake Edwards."

Accolades

In 2000, American Film Institute included the film in AFI's 100 Years...100 Laughs (#76).

See also
 Cross-dressing in film and television

Notes

References

External links

 
 
 
 
 
 James Garner Interview on the Charlie Rose Show 
 James Garner interview at Archive of American Television

1982 films
1982 LGBT-related films
1982 romantic comedy films
1980s American films
1980s British films
1980s English-language films
1980s musical comedy films
1980s romantic musical films
1980s sex comedy films
American LGBT-related films
American musical comedy films
American remakes of German films
American romantic comedy films
American romantic musical films
American sex comedy films
Best Foreign Film César Award winners
British LGBT-related films
British musical comedy films
British remakes of German films
British romantic comedy films
British romantic musical films
British sex comedy films
Comedy film remakes
Compositions by Leslie Bricusse
Cross-dressing in American films
Cross-dressing in British films
Drag (clothing)-related films
Films about trans men
Films adapted into plays
Films directed by Blake Edwards
Films featuring a Best Musical or Comedy Actress Golden Globe winning performance
Films scored by Henry Mancini
Films set in 1934
Films set in Paris
Films shot at Pinewood Studios
Films that won the Best Original Score Academy Award
Films with screenplays by Blake Edwards
LGBT-related controversies in film
Casting controversies in film
LGBT-related musical comedy films
LGBT-related romantic comedy films
LGBT-related sex comedy films
Metro-Goldwyn-Mayer films
Musical film remakes
Romance film remakes
Transgender-related films